Mangelia pyrgota is an extinct species of sea snail, a marine gastropod mollusk in the family Mangeliidae.

Description
The length of the shell attains 6.9 mm, its diameter 2.6 mm.

Distribution
This extinct marine species was found in Miocene strata in the Alum Bluff Group, Florida, USA

References

External links
 Worldwide Mollusc Species Data Base: Mangelia pyrgota

pyrgota
Gastropods described in 1937